Gennady Martirosyan (born 23 February 1980) is an Armenian professional boxer. He held the WBO European middleweight title, as well as being a contender for the WBO World middleweight title, losing against Dmitry Pirog.

Pro
Martirosyans debut came on 30 September 2005. In November 2008, 15 fights and 14 wins later, he won his first title match, beating Alexey Chirkov for the Vacant Russian Middleweight title in Saint Petersburg.

In his next fight, on 20 February 2009, Martirosyan knocked out Thailand's Kiatchai Singwancha for the PABA middleweight title. In April he successfully defended this title with a unanimous decision victory over Vedran Akrap.

on June 27, 2009 he faced his biggest challenge yet in fighting the undefeated future interim champion Hassan N'Dam N'Jikam. After going down in the third round but recovering, Martirosyan was knocked out in the tenth round and registered his second defeat.

Back in St Petersburg and a recovery win later, Martirosyan fought for the vacant WBO European middleweight title. He was successful, on October 31, 2009 he stopped Miguel Angel Pena by 5th-round TKO.

Martirosyan spent 2010 defending his title. After knockout wins over Aziz Daari and Vitor Sa, he became WBOs number one ranked middleweight contender.

This of course finally meant the chance to face Dmitry Pirog to become world champion. The battle took place on September 25, 2011 in Krasnodar and would be the second to last fight for both fighters. They fought for ten rounds, with Pirog leading and Martirosyan cut badly. Martirosyan could not come out of his corner for the 11th and the bout was stopped with Pirog victorious.

In 2017, after four years of inactivity, Martirosyan made a comeback, defeating Georgian Nikolozi Tasidis Gviniashvili by decision in Germany.

References

Armenian male boxers
1980 births
Living people
Sportspeople from Yerevan
Middleweight boxers